Andy Chan may refer to:

Chan Ho-nam, fictional character in Hong Kong Manhua series Teddyboy 
Chan Ho-tin (born 1990), Hong Kong political activist